Kensie Bobo (born 15 October 1992) is a Haitian women's association football player who plays as a forward.

References

External links 
 

1992 births
Living people
Haitian women's footballers
Haiti women's international footballers
Women's association football forwards